Enrique Lucca (born 23 December 1923) is a Venezuelan former sports shooter. He competed in the 50 metre rifle, prone event at the 1956 Summer Olympics.

References

External links
 

1923 births
Living people
Venezuelan male sport shooters
Olympic shooters of Venezuela
Shooters at the 1956 Summer Olympics
Pan American Games medalists in shooting
Pan American Games bronze medalists for Venezuela
Shooters at the 1963 Pan American Games
20th-century Venezuelan people
21st-century Venezuelan people